Hose's mongoose (Herpestes brachyurus hosei) is a subspecies of the short-tailed mongoose, but it is sometimes considered a separate species instead, Herpestes hosei. It is only known from a single specimen, an adult female taken in the Baram district, Sarawak, Malaysia, in 1893. Apart from having reddish brown short hair, straighter claws and more slender, smaller skull with a less rounded coronoid process on the lower jaw, it resembles other subspecies of the short-tailed mongoose.

References

Mongooses
Mammals of Southeast Asia
Carnivorans of Malaysia
Mammals of Borneo
Endemic fauna of Borneo